Woman in Science is a book written by John Augustine Zahm (under the pen name H. J. Mozans) in 1913. It is an account of women who have contributed to the sciences, up to the time when it was published.

Themes
The comprehensive theme that is depicted throughout Woman in Science is that of women's equal biological capacity. It is asserted that women being less prominent than men in science is due to the lack of educational and career opportunities available rather than the biological aspects of brain size or structure. In addition, the book encompasses the many developments of science throughout history. The main objective of the author/book was for women to become more involved and gain a respected position in the scientific field, in addition to increasing educational and career opportunities for women interested in science. It was one of the first collaborations of women's contributions to the scientific community, and it "explored the barriers to women's participation in science."

Quotations

PREFACE

Chapters in the book
I:Woman's Long Struggle for Things of the Mind
II: Woman's Capacity for Scientific Pursuit
III: Woman in Mathematics
IV: Woman in Astronomy
V: Woman in Physics
VI: Woman in Chemistry
VII: Woman in Natural Sciences
VIII: Woman in Medicine and Surgery
IX: Woman in Archaeology
X: Woman in Invention
XI: Woman as Inspirers and Collaborators in Science
XII: The Future of Woman in Science: Summary and Epilogue

Women chronicled in the book
The biographies include, but are not limited to, the following women, by chapter:

 Cornelia, Aurelia, Porcia, Servilia, Madame du Deffand, Elizabeth Barrett Browning
 Christine de Pizan, Sonya Kovalevsky, Dr. Mary Putnam Jacobi, Mrs. Henry Fawcett
 Hypatia, Maria Gaetana Agnesi, Empress Maria Theresa
 Caroline Herschel, Mme. Lepaute, Mme. Du Pierry, Duchesse Louise
 Laura Bassi, Mary Somerville, Mrs. Ayrton
 Mme. Lavoisier, Ms. Ellen Swallow/Richards, Marie Curie
 Anna Manzolini, Mdm de Beausoleil, Maria Sibylla Merian
 Bitisia Gozzadina, Maria Vittoria Dosi, Bettina Calendrini and Norella Calendrini
 Ms. Blackwell
 Elisabetta Gonzaga, Isabella d'Este, Anna Murphy
 Caroline Herschel, Elizabeth Agassiz, Lady Baker, Marie Aimee, Sophia Charlotte, Queen Christina of Sweden, Sister Celeste
 Even Portia, Étienne Lamy, Mme. Curie, Mme. Coudreau, Mary Kingsley, Zelia Nuttall, Harriet Boyd Hawes, Donna Eersilia Bovatillo, Sophie Pereyaslawewa

References

1913 books
Women and science
Works about women
Works about Servilia (mother of Brutus)